Anouschka Bernhard  (born 5 October 1970 in Waiblingen) is a retired German footballer who played as a defender. She was a member of the Germany women's national football team, among others at the 1995 FIFA Women's World Cup. On club level she plays for VfL Sindelfingen and FSV Frankfurt in Germany.

References

1970 births
Living people
People from Waiblingen
Sportspeople from Stuttgart (region)
German women's footballers
Germany women's international footballers
VfL Sindelfingen
FSV Frankfurt (women) players
1995 FIFA Women's World Cup players
Women's association football defenders
UEFA Women's Championship-winning players
Footballers from Baden-Württemberg
German women's football managers